John Hammond (born 4 August 1933) is a British bobsledder. He competed in the two-man and the four man events at the 1972 Winter Olympics.

References

1933 births
Living people
British male bobsledders
Olympic bobsledders of Great Britain
Bobsledders at the 1972 Winter Olympics
Sportspeople from London